Henry Robson may refer to:

 Henry Robson (songwriter) (1775–1850), Tyneside concert hall songwriter and performer
 Henry Howey Robson (1894–1964), English recipient of the Victoria Cross